The R577 road is a regional road in Ireland. It travels from the N21 road to the N72 road, via the town of Castleisland in County Kerry and the villages of Ballydesmond, Kiskeam and Boherbue in County Cork.

References

Regional roads in the Republic of Ireland
Roads in County Kerry
Roads in County Cork